The 2005 FIBA Europe Under-20 Championship for Women was the fourth edition of the Women's European basketball championship for national under-20 teams. It was held in Brno, Czech Republic, from 1 to 10 July 2005. France women's national under-20 basketball team won the tournament and became the European champions for the first time.

Participating teams

First round
In the first round, the teams were drawn into four groups of four. The first two teams from each group advance to the quarterfinal round, the other teams will play in the classification round for 9th–16th place.

Group A

Group B

Group C

Group D

Quarterfinal round
In this round, the teams play in two groups of four. The first two teams from each group advance to the semifinals, the other teams will play in the 5th–8th place playoffs.

Group E

Group F

Classification round for 9th–16th place
In this round, the teams play in two groups of four. The first two teams from each group advance to the 9th–12th place playoffs, the other teams will play in the 13th–16th place playoffs.

Group G

Group H

13th–16th place playoffs

13th–16th place semifinals

15th place match

13th place match

9th–12th place playoffs

9th–12th place semifinals

11th place match

9th place match

5th–8th place playoffs

5th–8th place semifinals

7th place match

5th place match

Championship playoffs

Semifinals

3rd place match

Final

Final standings

References

2005
2005–06 in European women's basketball
2005–06 in Czech basketball
International women's basketball competitions hosted by the Czech Republic
International youth basketball competitions hosted by the Czech Republic
FIBA U20
July 2005 sports events in Europe